East Jesus is a collection of material Lee Ranaldo recorded between 1981 and 1991. It was released on Atavistic Records. Tracks 2, 5, 8 and 10 are pieces that appeared on the CD version of his first LP From Here to Infinity or slight re-edits of that material. The rest of the collection ranges from obscure compilations and 7" releases, or previously unreleased material.

Track listing
 "The Bridge" – 3:17
 "Time Stands Still/Destruction Site/Oroboron/Slo Drone" – 10:11
 "Some Distortion..." – 12:22
 "Live co # 1" - 8:49
 "New Groove Loop" - 2:52
 "Some Hammering..." - 0:33
 "Walker Groves" - 1:36
 "Fuzz/Locusts/To Mary X2/Lathe Speaks" - 7:22
 "Deva, Spain (Fragments)" - 2:03
 "The Resolution/King's Ogg" - 6:32

References

Lee Ranaldo albums
1995 compilation albums